Borodino is a rural locality (a khutor) in Rossoshenskoye Rural Settlement, Gorodishchensky District, Volgograd Oblast, Russia. The population was 73 as of 2010. There are 3 streets.

Geography 
Borodino is located in steppe, 41 km northwest of Gorodishche (the district's administrative centre) by road. Stepnoy is the nearest rural locality.

References 

Rural localities in Gorodishchensky District, Volgograd Oblast
Tsaritsynsky Uyezd